The Peasants' Party–Lupu (PȚ–Lupu) was a political party in Romania.

History
The party was formed by Nicolae L. Lupu in 1927 after the Peasants' Party merged into the National Peasants' Party. In the 1928 general elections it received 2.5% of the vote, winning five seats in the Chamber of Deputies. It increased its vote share to 3.5% in the 1931 elections, winning seven seats. After receiving 6% of the vote in the 1932 elections the party won 12 seats in the Chamber and one seat in the Senate. However, it lost one Chamber seat and its Senate seat in the 1933 elections as its vote share fell to 5.5%.

Electoral history

Legislative elections

References

Agrarian parties in Romania
Defunct socialist parties in Romania
Political parties established in 1927
Political parties disestablished in 1934
National Peasants' Party breakaway groups